Sixpence in her Shoe may refer to:
A 1963 book by Phyllis McGinley
A book by Frances McNeil about history of the Leeds Childrens Holiday Camp Association
"a silver sixpence in her shoe" in British wedding lore, in the rhyme Something old